The 1935 USC Trojans football team represented the University of Southern California (USC) in the 1935 college football season. In their 11th year under head coach Howard Jones, the Trojans compiled a 5–7 record (2–4 against conference opponents), finished in eighth place in the Pacific Coast Conference, and outscored their opponents by a combined total of 155 to 124.

Schedule

References

USC
USC Trojans football seasons
Poi Bowl champion seasons
USC Trojans football